Love's Boomerang (also known as Perpetua) is a 1922 British crime film directed by John S. Robertson. Alfred Hitchcock is credited as a title designer. The film is now lost.

Plot
As described in a film magazine, young Perpetua (Fosse), an orphan, is adopted by Brian McCree (Powell), an artist. The two go on a holiday tour through France where they meet Monsieur Lamballe (Byford), the owner of a circus. The circus elephant has been pawned by Lamballe, and the artist, seeking the discomfort in the eyes of Perpetua, buys the claim against the animal. The two wanders join the circus troupe. For several years the artist and girl travel with the circus, leading delightful vagabond lives. Later, Perpetua is sent to a convent and the discovery is made by the criminal Russell Felton (Miltern) that she is his abandoned daughter. The crook has been leading a youth, who is heir to some wealth, to physical destruction, and sees in Perpetua (Forrest) an opportunity to further assure himself of the fortune. The youth falls in love with the young woman who, urged by her father, marries him. Now Felton seeks to strengthen his scheme by forcing liquor on the youth, while Perpetua seeks to cure him of his cravings for drink. Hoping to hasten things, Felton poisons a drought which the young wife gives to her feverish husband. She is charged with murder and Felton's testimony results in a verdict of guilty. The dead youth had changed his will in Perpetua's favor, and Felton writes a confession and prepares to flee when a convict to whom Felton had promised money confronts him. In a gun duel both are killed. McCree, secretly working for Perpetua's freedom, meets her on her release, and they both realize their love for each other.

Cast
 Ann Forrest as Perpetua
 Bunty Fosse as Perpetua, as a child
 David Powell as Brian McCree
 John Miltern as Russell Felton
 Roy Byford as Monsieur Lamballe
 Florence Wood as Madame Lamballe
 Geoffrey Kerr as Saville Mender
 Lillian Walker as Stella Daintry
 Lionel d'Aragon as Christian
 Ollie Emery as Madame Tourterelle
 Amy Willard as Jane Egg
 Tom Volbecque as Auguste
 Frank Stanmore as Corn Chandler

See also
 Alfred Hitchcock filmography

References

External links

1922 films
1922 crime films
British crime films
British silent feature films
British black-and-white films
Films directed by John S. Robertson
Lost British films
1922 lost films
Lost crime films
1920s British films
1920s English-language films